The Heroic Imagination Project (HIP) is a non-profit research and education organization dedicated to promoting heroism in everyday life. 

HIP started as the controversial Stanford Prison Experiment by founder and director Philip Zimbardo in 1971 that later became a collective social experiment. It conducts trainings and workshops that tackle bullying, police oversight, racism or sexism for businesses and schools across the United States and other nations around the world. It works with several governmental agencies like the Police Orientation and Preparation Program to better understand the impact of bias on oversight strategies, profiling tendencies and safety protocol.

As of 2011, the project is collecting data from former American gang members and individuals with former ties to terrorism for comparison, in an attempt to better understand how individuals change violent behavior. This research portion of the project is co-headed by Rony Berger, Yotam Heineburg, and Leonard Beckum. He published an article contrasting heroism and altruism in 2011 with Zeno Franco and Kathy Blau in the Review of General Psychology.

According to their website, HIP is a leader in giving people new skills through groundbreaking scientific research, experiential training workshops and social hackathons.

References

External links

 Official website

Moral psychology
Non-profit organizations based in the United States
Positive psychology